Cham TV also known as Sham TV is the first private satellite channel in Syria owned by businessman Mohamed Akram Aljundi. It was launched in Damascus since 2005. The channel continued for a period of 8 months, and then it closed in 2006 under the pretext of lack of access to a written statement allowing them to exercise their activities. Then later it began re-broadcast from the city of Cairo in September 2007.

References

External links

2005 establishments in Syria
Arabic-language television stations
Television channels in Syria
Television channels and stations established in 2005
Mass media in Damascus